Presidential elections are going to be held in Romania in either mid- or late November 2024, with an eventual second round to be held in late November or early December 2024 as well (depending on the final results of the first round). As the Romanian Constitution allows a maximum of two presidential terms (consecutive or not), incumbent President of Romania Klaus Iohannis, first elected in 2014 and then re-elected in 2019, is not eligible for re-election anymore.

Nevertheless, there is an ongoing speculation according to which the forthcoming Romanian presidential elections might occur earlier than to term, assuming that incumbent President Klaus Iohannis would be nominated as Secretary General of NATO and that he will accept the nomination, then the next Romanian presidential elections will likely take place in 2023 instead of 2024.

Candidates

National Liberal Party (PNL) 

President Klaus Iohannis is not eligible for another candidacy, therefore the party needs to find another suitable candidate. Former Prime Minister and former PNL president Ludovic Orban stated in Tecuci, Galați County, on 22 May 2021, that he does not "rule out" a candidacy in 2024. On 25 June 2021, then-Prime Minister Florin Cîțu stated in Piatra Neamț that he is "currently not considering" a presidential candidacy. Furthermore, fellow liberal party leaders consider proposing the incumbent president Klaus Iohannis as Prime Minister, after his presidential term ends in 2024.

Social Democratic Party (PSD) 

In a televised talk show, on 24 April 2021, the party leader Marcel Ciolacu stated that "is very likely" that the party president (himself, at that time) will not run for president in 2024. Asked about considering a presidential candidacy, member of the Chamber of Deputies, Alexandru Rafila vaguely answered on 4 July 2021 "never say never", but underlined that running for president is "definitely not my goal". In another televised talk show, former Prime Minister Sorin Grindeanu stated that the party is "going for the win" in all elections scheduled in 2024 (legislative elections, local elections, European Parliament elections, and presidential elections) and he "did not rule out" that Mircea Geoană could be, yet again, the party's presidential candidate. Mircea Geoană ran for president in 2009, but narrowly lost in the second round to Traian Băsescu, who was then re-elected for a second and last term. According to ongoing speculation, Mircea Geoană might very well run for presidency in 2024, but it is yet unclear if he will receive PSD support, according to incumbent PSD president Marcel Ciolacu.

Save Romania Union (USR) 
Former 2019 candidate Dan Barna (and party co-president) stated in several interviews in April 2021 that his candidacy is "not ruled out" and that his candidacy is a "real scenario". Party co-president Dacian Cioloș stated in an interview, on 18 February 2021, that he is also considering running in 2024. On 1 October 2021, Cioloș stated that his objective is to win the 2024 presidential election, claiming that he is willing to candidate as well.

People's Movement Party (PMP) 

Cristian Diaconescu, then newly elected president of the party in early 2021, was designated the party's presidential candidate. However, some analysts believed that Mihail Neamțu, a current member of the PMP, might run for presidency instead, either as an independent (with PMP support) or as a candidate from another party. On 23 March 2022, Cristian Diaconescu was excluded from the party by the new leadership, thus losing his presidential candidate status previously granted by the PMP.

Force of the Right (FD) 

On 28 June 2022, former Prime Minister, former PNL president, and current Force of the Right (FD) leader Ludovic Orban officially announced that he will run for president in 2024, also stating that he doesn't want to support any other candidate, being tremendously disappointed by incumbent President of Romania, Klaus Iohannis. Thus, Orban becomes the second former PNL president to run for the Romanian presidency supported by a breakaway faction of the PNL after Călin Popescu-Tăriceanu (Prime Minister between 2004 and 2008) who ran on behalf of the Liberal Reformist Party (PLR; one of the predecessors of the Romanian ALDE founded in 2015 through a merger with the Conservative Party (PC) and subsequently absorbed by the PNL in March 2022) in 2014, during that year's presidential elections.

Publicly expressed interest
These individuals have not declared their clear intention to run, but are considering a candidacy.

Potential candidates 

These individuals have been subject to public speculation and/or vague declarations made by themselves, but have publicly yet to firmly deny or confirm their interest in running for president.

Withdrawn candidates 

These individuals have been official candidates or considered their candidacy, but have withdrawn from the race or they lost the support of their party and, so far, have not reconsidered their intentions.

Declined to be candidates 

These individuals have been the subject of speculation, but have publicly denied or recanted their interest in running for president. Also, individuals that were subject to public speculation, but are legally barred from running for president are included here.

Timeline

Polls

Round I

First round

Opinion polls with potential candidates (starting from 2021)

Approval ratings for the incumbent president

Approval ratings for Klaus Iohannis

References

Romania
President
Presidential election
Presidential elections in Romania